Skowroneck or Skowronek (en: Lark) may refer to:
 
Skowronek, Pomeranian Voivodeship, a village in northern Poland
Skowronek (surname), people with the last name.
Skowronek (horse), an Arabian stallion
Ben Skowronek